__notoc__

Andrew Louth  (born 11 November 1944) is an English theologian. He is an emeritus professor of patristic and Byzantine studies in the Department of Theology and Religion of Durham University. Louth has been at Durham University since 1996. Previously he taught at the University of Oxford (mostly patristics) and at Goldsmiths' College in Byzantine and early medieval history. He is a fellow of the British Academy and was a member of the British Academy Council from 2011 to 2014. He was President of the Ecclesiastical History Society (2009–10).

Born on 11 November 1944 in Louth, Lincolnshire, he was educated at the universities of Cambridge and Edinburgh.

Formerly an Anglican priest, he converted to Eastern Orthodoxy in 1989 and was ordained as an Eastern Orthodox priest in 2003.

Selected publications 

Louth, Andrew (1989), Discerning the Mystery: An Essay on the Nature of Theology, Clarendon, 
Louth, Andrew; Oden, Thomas C.; Conti, Marco (2001). Genesis 1-11; Volume 1. Taylor & Francis. ISBN 1579582206.

See also 
 Russian Orthodox Diocese of Sourozh

References

Sources

External links 

"The Nicene Creed", In Our Time, Andrew Louth on the panel with Caroline Humfress and Martin Palmer, 2007

1944 births
20th-century Anglican theologians
20th-century Church of England clergy
20th-century English Anglican priests
20th-century English historians
20th-century English theologians
21st-century Eastern Orthodox priests
21st-century Eastern Orthodox theologians
21st-century English historians
21st-century English theologians
Academics of Durham University
Academics of Goldsmiths, University of London
Alumni of the University of Cambridge
Alumni of the University of Edinburgh
British historians of religion
Church of England priests
College chaplains of the University of Oxford
Converts to Eastern Orthodoxy from Anglicanism
English Eastern Orthodox Christians
Fellows of the British Academy
Fellows of Worcester College, Oxford
Living people
Patristic scholars
People from Louth, Lincolnshire
Presidents of the Ecclesiastical History Society
Recipients of the Order of Sankt Ignatios
Russian Orthodox clergy